Rhynchospora rugosa, known by the common name of claybank beaksedge, is a member of the sedge family, Cyperaceae. It is a perennial herb, native to Central and South America.

While Plants of the World Online accepts the African Rhynchospora brownii as an extant species, it is considered to be a subspecies of Rhynchospora rugosa by the Global Biodiversity Information Facility.

References

External links

rugosa
Flora of South America
Flora of Central America
Flora of the Caribbean
Flora of Hawaii
Plants described in 1798
Plants described in 1944